Khalifeh-ye Heydar (also Romanized as Khalīfeh-ye Ḩeydar; also known as Shahīd Sobḩānī, and Ţalaylī) is a village in Ahudasht Rural District, Shavur District, Shush County, Khuzestan Province, Iran. At the 2006 Census, its population was 537, in 69 families.

References 

Populated places in Shush County